Song Myeong-Seob (born June 29, 1984) is a South Korean Taekwondo athletic and a member of Kyung Hee University's Taekwondo team. He measures 1,77 m in height and 69 kg in weight.

Song was on the South Korean Taekwondo team at the 2004 Summer Olympic Games held in Athens, Greece.  He won the Bronze medal after losing to eventual gold medalist Hadi Saei Bonehkohal.  Song defeated Brazil's Diogo Silva for the Bronze medal in the Repechage ladder.

See also
 List of South Korean athletes
 Sport in South Korea

External links 
 
  
 

1984 births
Living people
South Korean male taekwondo practitioners
Olympic taekwondo practitioners of South Korea
Taekwondo practitioners at the 2004 Summer Olympics
Olympic bronze medalists for South Korea
Asian Games medalists in taekwondo
Olympic medalists in taekwondo
Taekwondo practitioners at the 2006 Asian Games
Medalists at the 2004 Summer Olympics
Asian Games gold medalists for South Korea
Medalists at the 2006 Asian Games
World Taekwondo Championships medalists
21st-century South Korean people